Computer Cooties is a mixtape by American hip hop artist Busdriver. It was released on October 6, 2010. It was available free on Busdriver's official website for a limited time.

Track listing

References

External links
 

2010 mixtape albums
Busdriver albums